Kuany Kuany (born 27 March 2000) is a South Sudanese-Australian college basketball player for the California Golden Bears of the Pac-12 Conference.

High school career
Kuany attended Victory Rock Prep and Prolific Prep. In May 2019, Kuany committed to the California Golden Bears. He chose the Golden Bears over Washington State and Nevada.

College career
Kuany missed a game on January 9, 2021 due to a concussion.

Career statistics

College

|-
| style="text-align:left;"| 2019–20
| style="text-align:left;"| California
| 28 || 2 || 6.6 || .389 || .357 || .667 || 1.1 || .3 || .1 || .1 || 2.2
|-
| style="text-align:left;"| 2020–21
| style="text-align:left;"| California
| 26 || 3 || 9.3 || .429 || .200 || .647 || 1.3 || .4 || .0 || .2 || 2.3
|- class="sortbottom"
| style="text-align:center;" colspan="2"| Career
| 54 || 5 || 7.9 || .410 || .276 || .658 || 1.2 || .3 || .1 || .2 || 2.3

References

External links
California Golden Bears bio

1995 births
Living people
Power forwards (basketball)
South Sudanese men's basketball players
California Golden Bears men's basketball players